A total lunar eclipse will take place on Friday, 14 March 2025, the first of two total lunar eclipses in 2025. The Moon will take place near apogee during this eclipse, making it appear smaller than usual. The second eclipse will take place on 7 September 2025, happening near perigee. Occurring only 3.4 days before apogee (Apogee on 17 March 2025), the Moon's apparent diameter will be 5.4% smaller than average.

This lunar eclipse marks the beginning of another almost tetrad, with 3 total lunar eclipses and a deep partial lunar eclipse (greater than 90%), with others being 07 Sep 2025 (T), 03 Mar 2026 (T) and 28 Aug 2026 (P).

Visibility
It will be completely visible from the Americas, will be seen rising over New Zealand and eastern Asia, and setting over western Europe and western Africa.

Related eclipses

Eclipses of 2025 
 A total lunar eclipse on 14 March.
 A partial solar eclipse on 29 March.
 A total lunar eclipse on 7 September.
 A partial solar eclipse on 21 September.

Lunar year series

Saros series

It last occurred on March 3, 2007 and will next occur on March 25, 2043.

Metonic cycles (19 years)

Half-Saros cycle
A lunar eclipse will be preceded and followed by solar eclipses by 9 years and 5.5 days (a half saros). This lunar eclipse is related to two total solar eclipses of Solar Saros 130.

See also
List of lunar eclipses and List of 21st-century lunar eclipses

Notes

External links
Saros cycle 123

2025-03
2025-03
2025 in science